The 1925–26  Hong Kong First Division League season was the 18th since its establishment.

League table

References
1925–26 Hong Kong First Division table (RSSSF)
香港倒後鏡blog

1925 in Hong Kong sport
1926 in Hong Kong sport
Hong Kong First Division League seasons
Hong Kong
Hong Kong